The Cisa Pass or La Cisa Pass is a mountain pass in Italy that marks the division between the Ligurian and Tuscan Apennines. It is located on the border between northern Tuscany (Province of Massa-Carrara) and Emilia-Romagna (Province of Parma), near the source of the Magra River at an altitude of 1,040 meters (3,414 feet) above sea level.

See also
 List of highest paved roads in Europe
 List of mountain passes

Notes

References
 Webster's New Geographical Dictionary, Third Edition. Springfield, Massachusetts: Merriam-Webster, Inc., 1997. .

Mountain passes of Tuscany
Mountain passes of Emilia-Romagna
Mountain passes of the Apennines